Phanerochaetum is a genus of flies in the family Cryptochetidae. There is one described species Phanerochaetum tuxeni.

References

Cryptochetidae
Monotypic Diptera genera